Team USA Basketball is a 1992 video game that was available for the Sega Mega Drive/Genesis game console. The game is a spinoff following the success of the Bulls vs Lakers video game as well as the popularity explosion of the 1992 United States men's Olympic basketball team also known as the "Dream Team". It is the third game in the NBA Playoffs series of games.

A three-card set was bundled with each copy of the game. Put together, the cards showed the entire roster against a sky background with the words, "BARCELONA '92" in red and white.

Gameplay
The game could be played in various ways: players could play against each other, or against the computer. Games against the computer were divided into two modes, "Exhibition" or "Tournament". Players could pick from one of the countries around the world to represent in the Olympics:
 
 
 
 
 
 
 
 
 
 
 
 
 
 

In the actual Olympic tournament, Croatia took the silver medal in the USA's closest match, with Lithuania taking bronze after being defeated by the US in the semi-finals.

The player can also use an All-World team, comprising the best players among the non-US squads, including Toni Kukoč, Bill Wennington, Andrew Gaze, Rik Smits, Sarunas Marciulionis and Vlade Divac.

Puerto Rico and Venezuela participated at the 1992 Summer Olympics'men's basketball tournament; these nations' teams did not appear in the game.

Games could be configured for international 20 minute halves. The court was also different from the usual NBA game since it followed international dimensions, with a trapezoidal area and a different 3-point line.

USA Roster 

The game had the entire Team USA Roster including late addition Clyde Drexler and NCAA star Christian Laettner.

The USA roster for the game is:
 4 Christian Laettner – Duke University Blue Devils
 5 David Robinson – San Antonio Spurs
 6 Patrick Ewing – New York Knicks
 7 Larry Bird – Boston Celtics
 8 Scottie Pippen – Chicago Bulls
 9 Michael Jordan – Chicago Bulls
 10 Clyde Drexler – Portland Trail Blazers
 11 Karl Malone – Utah Jazz
 12 John Stockton – Utah Jazz
 13 Chris Mullin – Golden State Warriors
 14 Charles Barkley – Phoenix Suns
 15 Magic Johnson – no team; formerly with the Los Angeles Lakers

Reception
Spanish magazine OK Consolas gave the game a score of 92.

See also 
NBA 2K13 – video game featuring the 1992 USA basketball team

References 

1992 video games
Basketball video games
Electronic Arts games
Sega Genesis games
Sega Genesis-only games
Video games set in 1992
Video games set in Spain
Barcelona in fiction
Summer Olympic video games
Multiplayer and single-player video games
Video games developed in the United States